The Notorious Miss Lisle is a 1920 American silent drama film directed by James Young and starring Katherine MacDonald, Nigel Barrie, and Margaret Campbell. The film's sets were designed by the art director Milton Menasco.

Cast
 Katherine MacDonald as Gaenor Lisle 
 Nigel Barrie as Peter Garstin 
 Margaret Campbell as Mrs. Lisle 
 Ernest Joy as Major Lisle 
 William Clifford as Craven 
 Dorothy Cumming as Mrs. Lyons

References

Bibliography
 Monaco, James. The Encyclopedia of Film. Perigee Books, 1991.

External links

1920 films
1920 drama films
Silent American drama films
Films directed by James Young
American silent feature films
1920s English-language films
American black-and-white films
First National Pictures films
1920s American films